The 2014 Tour of Qinghai Lake is the 13th edition of an annual professional road bicycle racing stage race held in Qinghai Province, China since 2002, named after Qinghai Lake. The race is run at the highest category (apart from those races which make up the UCI World Tour, and is rated by the International Cycling Union (UCI) as a 2.HC (hors category) race as part of the UCI Asia Tour.

Teams
Twenty-two teams competed in the 2014 Tour of Qinghai Lake. These included five UCI Professional Continental and seventeen UCI Continental teams.

The teams that participated in the race were:

Route

Stages

Stage 1
6 July 2014 — Xining to Xining,

Stage 2
7 July 2014 —  to Datong,

Stage 3
8 July 2014 — Huzhu to Xihai,

Stage 4
9 July 2014 — Xihai to Heimahe,

Stage 5
10 July 2014 — Qinghai Lake to Guide,

Stage 6
11 July 2014 — Guide to Tongren,

Stage 7
12 July 2014 — Tongren to Hualong,

Stage 8
13 July 2014 — Xunhua to Lintao,

Stage 9
15 July 2014 — Tianshui to Tianshui,

Stage 10
16 July 2014 — Tianshui to Pingliang,

Stage 11
17 July 2014 — Yinchuan to Yinchuan,

Stage 12
18 July 2014 — Zhongwei to Zhongwei,

Stage 13
19 July 2014 — Lanzhou to Lanzhou,

Classification leadership table

Notes

References

Tour of Qinghai Lake
2014 in men's road cycling
2014 in Chinese sport